Sharshara (Russian and Tajik: Шаршара, formerly Yaloqjar or Alakdzhar) is a village in Sughd Region, northern Tajikistan. It is part of the jamoat Chinor in the city of Panjakent.

References

Populated places in Sughd Region